The Central Flying School is a flight school of the South African Air Force. It is an ab initio flight training school. The unit was formed as the central point of flying training after closure of all Air Force flying schools in South Africa. The unit operates a fleet of 55 aircraft and qualifies approximately 50 students and 20 instructors per annum.

References

Squadrons of the South African Air Force